Adolfo Van Praet is a village and rural locality (municipality) in La Pampa Province in Argentina.

Population
Adolfo Van Praet has a population of 274 inhabitants (INDEC, 2001). This represents an increase of 11.8% over the 245 inhabitants of the previous census (INDEC, 1991).

External links
History of Adolfo Van Praet

References

Populated places in La Pampa Province